William Ambrose Bennett (April 1872 – after 1900), generally known as Billy Bennett, was an English professional footballer born in Altrincham, Cheshire, who played as an outside right. He made more than 100 appearances in the Football League playing for Crewe Alexandra and Small Heath.

When Crewe finished bottom of the Second Division for the second consecutive season and failed to be re-elected to the league for the 1896–97 season, Bennett joined Small Heath. He contributed to Small Heath's runners-up spot in the Second Division in the 1900–01 season and consequent promotion to the First Division, but left the club for Stafford Rangers of the Birmingham & District League later that year.

References

1872 births
Year of death missing
People from Altrincham
English footballers
Association football outside forwards
Crewe Alexandra F.C. players
Birmingham City F.C. players
Stafford Rangers F.C. players